Ville vesten was a Norwegian Reality TV series hosted by Liv Marit Wedvik that aired on TV3.

Plot
Twelve Norwegian contestants drive a herd of cattle through Arizona's desert. The show tests cowboy knowledge and eliminates contestants along the drive. The winner receives a sum of money for cattle at a cattle auction in Willcox, Arizona.

Ratings
The series was broadcast on Sunday evenings in prime time, but was moved after it flopped. The first episode was watched by 95,000 viewers, the second episode was watched by 61,000 viewers.

References

TV3 (Norway) original programming
Norwegian reality television series
2006 Norwegian television series debuts